The weightlifting competition at the 1956 Summer Olympics in Melbourne consisted of seven weight classes, all for men only.

Medal summary

Medal table

References

Sources
 

 
1956 Summer Olympics events
1956
1956 in weightlifting
International weightlifting competitions hosted by Australia